Mladen Banović is a Bosnian scientist specialised for transformers. He is a founder and editor-in-chief of the Transformers Magazine and director at Merit Services Int., a company specialized in R&D, and education/training on transformers.

He graduated in 1999 and obtained his doctorate in 2012 at the Faculty of Electrical Engineering and Computing of the University of Zagreb. He is an author of several scientific articles and works.

References

External links 
 Mladen Banović in Who is who in the Croatian science

Living people
Faculty of Science, University of Zagreb alumni
Croatian scientists
Year of birth missing (living people)